John Hardy may refer to:

"John Hardy" (song) (first recorded 1924), an American folk song about a murderer, hanged in 1896
John Hardy (aviator) (born 1942), Australian aviator and Administrator of the Northern Territory
John Hardy (composer) (born 1957), British composer, active since 1994
John Hardy (geneticist) (born 1954), British human geneticist and molecular biologist
John Hardy (jewelry), jewelry company, founded in 1975
John Hardy (fl. 1395–1406), MP for Wilton
John Hardy (MP for Bradford) (1773–1855), British MP and businessman and father of first Earl of Cranbrook
John Hardy (US politician) (1835–1913), U.S. Representative from New York
Sir John Hardy, 1st Baronet (1809–1888), British Conservative Member of Parliament
John Crumpton Hardy (1864–1938), President of the Mississippi Agricultural and Mechanical College
John Richard Hardy (1807–1858), Australian gold commissioner
John Stockdale Hardy (1793–1849), English attorney
John Spencer Hardy (1913–2012), American lieutenant general during World War II
Jack Hardy (singer-songwriter) (John Studebaker Hardy, 1947–2011), American lyrical singer-songwriter and playwright
John Hardy (footballer) (1899–1932), English footballer
John Herbert Hardy (1893–1969), British Army officer
John Hardy, American producer of films such as Schizopolis
John Hardy (minister), English minister who ran a dissenting academy in Nottingham
John Hardy, founder of Hardy Brothers jewellers in 1853

See also
Jack Hardy (disambiguation)
 John Hardie (disambiguation)
Sir John Francis Gathorne-Hardy (1874–1949), British First World War General who served in Italy and the Western Front
John Gathorne-Hardy, 2nd Earl of Cranbrook (1839–1911), British peer and Conservative Member of Parliament
John Hardee (1918–1984), American jazz musician
Jonny Hardy (born 1934), Israeli footballer
Jonathan Hardy (1940–2012), New Zealand-born actor, writer and director

Hardy, John